Beijing University of Chemical Technology (BUCT), colloquially known in Chinese as Beihua (北化, Běihuà) or Huada (化大, Huàdà), is a public technological university in mainland China. BUCT was founded in 1958 and is a part of the Ministry of Education. As a member university of the Double First Class University Plan and Project 211, BUCT has developed from an institution of scientific specialties to a more comprehensive university, with a curriculum including liberal arts. It is a Chinese state Double First Class University identified by the Ministry of Education of China.

Campus
Covering an area of 64.4 hectares, the university is composed of three campuses:
East campus (headquarters): located on the eastern section of the North Third Ring Road, southeast of the Asian Games Village.
West campus: On the central section of the West Third Ring Road.
North campus: locates in Changping, near Lake Shisanling. Most of the North campus had been sold to China University of Petroleum while the remaining will be the dormitory for the staff, since the new North campus, a.k.a. Nankou campus, is a little bit more far from the East campus and requires additional dorm for staff.
Nankou campus: locates in Changping, about 5 km from the Changping Xishankou station of Beijing Subway Changping line. Near the Institute of Nuclear Energy Technology, Tsinghua University.

Undergraduates at BUCT spend their first three years at the Nankou campus and then transfer to the East section for the fourth year. Some of the postgraduates at BUCT spend their first year at the north campus.

The east campus is designated for all  postgraduate students.

Student life

Faculty

BUCT consists of 10 schools: Chemical Engineering, Materials Science and Engineering, Mechanical and Electrical Engineering, Information Science and Technology, Economic Management, Science, Humanities and Law, Life Science and Technology and Further Education and Vocational Education. There are approximately 1800 staff members on campus and 12,000 students.

Research and academic achievements

BUCT has fifteen research institutes and eight research centers across China. The university publishes three academic journals which are distributed at home and abroad. In recent years BUCT has undertaken research projects for state science and technology supported by the National Science Foundation and various ministries and enterprises.

Notable alumni

Zhou Xiaochuan - Governor of the People's Bank of China, in charge of the monetary policy of the People's Republic of China.
He Guoqiang - Member of Politburo Standing Committee of the Chinese Communist Party
Cheng Wei - founder of Didi Chuxing
“Grace” Jinliu Wang（王劲柳）- 17th President of Worcester Polytechnic Institute[United States]

References

External links
 Official Website 

 
Educational institutions established in 1958
Universities and colleges in Beijing
Project 211
Plan 111
1958 establishments in China